Parkstone railway station serves the Parkstone area of Poole in Dorset, England. The platform sign formerly read "Parkstone (for Sandbanks)".

The station is operated by South Western Railway and is served by both the Weymouth express and the Poole stopping services.

The station is able to accommodate trains of up to five coaches; longer trains only open the doors in the first four or five coaches depending on the type of unit operating the service.

It was served by the Somerset and Dorset Joint Railway line from Bath Green Park to Bournemouth West from 1874 until the Beeching Axe in 1966.

Until 1967 a branch goods line ran from here to the George Jennings South Western Pottery. The line extended from the Pottery to Salterns Pier, on the northern shores of Poole Harbour, until 1922.

The line between Bournemouth and Weymouth was electrified in 1988 using the standard British Rail Southern Region system of a third rail with 750 Volts direct current.

Services
The station is served by South Western Railway.

The typical off-peak stopping pattern of this station, as of June 2021, is below:
 1 train per hour on Monday-Friday on Poole-London Waterloo express service.
 2 trains per hour on Saturday, 1 on Weymouth-London Waterloo express service, and 1 on Poole-Winchester stopping service.
 1 train per hour on Sunday on Weymouth-London Waterloo express service.

External links 
 

Railway stations in Poole
Railway stations in Great Britain opened in 1874
Former London and South Western Railway stations
Railway stations served by South Western Railway
DfT Category E stations